Me llaman Martina Sola is a Mexican telenovela produced by Raúl Astor for Televisión Independiente de México in 1972.

Cast 
Joaquín Cordero - Rafael Corvalán
Chela Castro - Martina Durán
Claudia Islas - Irene
José Luis Jiménez - Joaquín Durán
María Rubio - Emma Solorio
Guillermo Aguilar
Lupe Andrade
Héctor Andremar - Julio
Mario Casillas 
Armando de Pascual 
María Eugenia Ríos
Otto Sirgo
Pedro Damián
Pedro Armendáriz Jr. - Jaime Corvalán

References

External links 

Mexican telenovelas
1972 telenovelas
Televisa telenovelas
Spanish-language telenovelas
1972 Mexican television series debuts
1972 Mexican television series endings